The ruins of Liebeneck Castle were once a high mediaeval spur castle in the southwestern part of the Heckengäu, a forested region southeast of the village of Würm, in the county of Pforzheim in the south German state of Baden-Württemberg.

Location 
The castle ruins are situated on heights above the River Würm with a view over the Würm valley. They lie in a Bannwald, a protected forest, at 415 metres above sea level. The ruins of Liebeneck cannot be reached by car; only forest tracks such as the Ostweg lead to it.

History 
The original castle was probably built in the 12th century. It is first mentioned in 1236 on the occasion of the transfer of the castle and village of Würm from the lords of Weißenstein at Kräheneck to Margrave Rudolph of Baden. The castle was intended to guard the rafting toll station by the river. Later the castle was an inherited fief of the lords of Weißenstein before ending up in the possession of the lords of Leutrum von Ertingen.

In 1692, during the Orleans War, the castle was razed.
In 1828 it was transferred to the state of Baden. The site was then deliberately destroyed so that "no riff-raff will find shelter there" ("Gesindel dort keinen Unterschlupf findet"). From 1968 to 1977 the 30-metre-high bergfried was renovated.

Site 
Of the original castle, the bergfried and several walls surrounding the castle courtyard survive. The double, pentagonal enceinte with its foreworks and zwingers are a feature of this heritage site. The ruins are maintained by the Hochbauamt (construction department). Immediately by the ruins is an information board with details of the castle.

References

Literature 
 Friedrich-Wilhelm Krahe: Burgen des deutschen Mittelalters. Grundriss-Lexikon. Lizenzausgabe. Bechtermünz, Augsburg, 1996, .

External links 

 Liebeneck Castle in the Pforzheim Municipal Wiki

Heritage sites in Baden-Württemberg
Pforzheim